The 63rd Writers Guild of America Awards honored the best film, television, and videogame writers of 2010. Winners were announced on February 5, 2011.

Nominees

Film

Best Original Screenplay
Inception — written by Christopher Nolan; Warner Bros.
Black Swan — screenplay by Mark Heyman and Andres Heinz and John McLaughlin; story by Andres Heinz; Fox Searchlight
The Fighter — screenplay by Scott Silver, Paul Tamasy, Eric Johnson; story by Keith Dorrington, Paul Tamasy, and Eric Johnson; Paramount Pictures
The Kids Are All Right — written by Lisa Cholodenko and Stuart Blumberg; Focus Features
Please Give — written by Nicole Holofcener; Sony Pictures Classics

Best Adapted Screenplay
The Social Network — screenplay by Aaron Sorkin; based on the book The Accidental Billionaires by Ben Mezrich; Sony Pictures
127 Hours — screenplay by Danny Boyle and Simon Beaufoy; based on the book Between a Rock and a Hard Place by Aron Ralston; Fox Searchlight
I Love You Phillip Morris — written by John Requa and Glenn Ficarra; based on the book I Love You Phillip Morris: A True Story of Life, Love, and Prison Breaks by Steven McVicker; Roadside Attractions
The Town — screenplay by Peter Craig, Ben Affleck, and Aaron Stockard; Based on the novel Prince of Thieves by Chuck Hogan; Warner Bros.
True Grit — screenplay by Joel Coen and Ethan Coen; Based on the novel True Grit by Charles Portis; Paramount Pictures

Best Documentary Feature screenplay
Inside Job produced, written, and directed by Charles Ferguson; co-written by Chad Beck and Adam Bolt; Sony Pictures Classics
Enemies of the People — written, directed, filmed and produced by Rob Lemkin and Thet Sambath; International Film Circuit
Freedom Riders — written, produced, and directed by Stanley Nelson Jr.; Based in part on the book Freedom Riders: 1961 and the Struggle for Racial Justice by Raymond Arsenault; American Experience
Gasland — written and directed by Josh Fox; HBO Documentary Films and International WOW Company
The Two Escobars — written by Michael Zimbalist, Jeff Zimbalist; ESPN Films
Who Is Harry Nilsson (And Why Is Everybody Talkin' About Him)? — written and directed by John Scheinfeld; Lorber Films

Television

Drama series
Mad Men — Jonathan Abrahams, Lisa Albert, Keith Huff, Jonathan Igla, Andre Jacquemetton, Maria Jacquemetton, Brett Johnson, Janet Leahy, Erin Levy, Tracy McMillan, Dahvi Waller, Matthew Weiner; AMC
Boardwalk Empire — Meg Jackson, Lawrence Konner, Howard Korder, Steve Kornacki, Margaret Nagle, Tim Van Patten, Paul Simms, Terence Winter; HBO
Breaking Bad — Sam Catlin, Vince Gilligan, Peter Gould, Gennifer Hutchison, George Mastras, Tom Schnauz, John Shiban, Moira Walley-Beckett; AMC
Dexter — Scott Buck, Manny Coto, Charles H. Eglee, Lauren Gussis, Chip Johannessen, Jim Leonard, Clyde Phillips, Scott Reynolds, Melissa Rosenberg, Tim Schlattmann, Wendy West; Showtime
Friday Night Lights — Bridget Carpenter, Kerry Ehrin, Ron Fitzgerald, Etan Frankel, Monica Henderson, David Hudgins, Rolin Jones, Jason Katims, Patrick Massett, Derek Santos Olson, John Zinman; NBC

Comedy series
Modern Family — Jerry Collins, Paul Corrigan, Alex Herschlag, Abraham Higginbotham, Elaine Ko, Joe Lawson, Steven Levitan, Christopher Lloyd, Dan O'Shannon, Jeffrey Richman, Brad Walsh, Ilana Wernick, Bill Wrubel, Danny Zuker; ABC
30 Rock — Jack Burditt, Hannibal Buress, Kay Cannon, Robert Carlock, Tom Ceraulo, Vali Chandrasekaran, Tina Fey, Jon Haller, Steve Hely, Matt Hubbard, Dylan Morgan, Paula Pell, John Riggi, Josh Siegal, Ron Weiner, Tracey Wigfield; NBC
Glee — Ian Brennan, Brad Falchuk, Ryan Murphy; Fox
Nurse Jackie — Liz Brixius, Rick Cleveland, Nancy Fichman, Liz Flahive, Jennifer Hoppe-House, Mark Hudis, Linda Wallem, Christine Zander; Showtime
The Office — Jennifer Celotta, Daniel Chun, Greg Daniels, Lee Eisenberg, Brent Forrester, Amelie Gillette, Charlie Grandy, Steve Hely, Jonathan A. Hughes, Mindy Kaling, Carrie Kemper, Jason Kessler, Paul Lieberstein, Warren Lieberstein, B.J. Novak, Peter Ocko, Robert Padnick, Aaron Shure, Justin Spitzer, Gene Stupnitsky, Halsted Sullivan, Jon Vitti; NBC

New series
Boardwalk Empire — Meg Jackson, Lawrence Konner, Howard Korder, Steve Kornacki, Margaret Nagle, Tim Van Patten, Paul Simms, Terence Winter; HBO
Justified — Dave Andron, Wendy Calhoun, Benjamin Cavell, Fred Golan, Gary Lennon, Benjamin Daniel Lobato, Chris Provenzano, Graham Yost; FX
Men of a Certain Age — Bridget Bedard, Tucker Cawley, Warren Hutcherson, Rick Muirragui, Jack Orman, Ray Romano, Mike Royce, Lew Schneider, Mark Stegemann; TNT
Treme — Lolis Eric Elie, David Mills, Eric Overmyer, George Pelecanos, Tom Piazza, Davis Rogan, David Simon; HBO
The Walking Dead — Frank Darabont; Charles H. Eglee, Adam Fierro, Robert Kirkman, Jack LoGiudice, Glen Mazzara; AMC

Episodic drama – any length – one airing time
"The Chrysanthemum and the Sword" (Mad Men) — Erin Levy; AMC
"Boom" (The Good Wife) — Ted Humphrey; CBS
"The End" (Lost) — Damon Lindelof & Carlton Cuse; ABC
"Help Me" (House) — Russel Friend & Garrett Lerner & Peter Blake; Fox
"I.F.T." (Breaking Bad) — George Mastras; AMC
"I See You" (Breaking Bad) — Gennifer Hutchison; AMC

Episodic comedy – any length – one airing time
"When It Rains, It Pours" (30 Rock) — Robert Carlock; NBC
"Anna Howard Shaw Day" (30 Rock) — Matt Hubbard; NBC
"Earthquake" (Modern Family) — Paul Corrigan & Brad Walsh; ABC
"Nightmayor" (The Sarah Silverman Program) — Dan Sterling; Comedy Central
"Starry Night" (Modern Family) — Danny Zuker; ABC
"Wuphf.com" (The Office) — Aaron Shure; NBC

Long form – original – over one hour – one or two parts, one or two airing times
The Special Relationship — Peter Morgan; HBO
You Don't Know Jack — Adam Mazer; HBO

Long form – adaptation – over one hour – one or two parts, one or two airing times
The Pacific, "Part Eight" — Robert Schenkkan and Michelle Ashford, Based in part on the books Helmet for My Pillow by Robert Leckie and With The Old Breed by Eugene B. Sledge with additional material from Red Blood, Black Sand by Chuck Tatum and China Marine by Eugene B. Sledge; HBO
The Pacific, “Part Four” — Robert Schenkkan and Graham Yost, Based in part on the books Helmet for My Pillow by Robert Leckie and With The Old Breed by Eugene B. Sledge with additional material from Red Blood, Black Sand by Chuck Tatum and China Marine by Eugene B. Sledge; HBO
The Pillars if the Earth — Written for television by John Pielmeier, Based on the book The Pillars of the Earth by Ken Follett; Starz
Temple Grandin — Teleplay by Christopher Monger and William Merritt Johnson, Based on the books Emergence by Temple Grandin and Margaret Scariano and Thinking in Pictures by Temple Grandin; HBO

Animation – any length – one airing time
"The Prisoner of Benda" (Futurama) — Ken Keeler; Comedy Central
"Lrrreconcilable Ndndifferences" (Futurama) — Patric M. Verrone; Comedy Central
"Moe Letter Blues" (The Simpsons) — Stephanie Gillis; Fox
"O Brother, Where Bart Thou?" (The Simpsons) — Matt Selman; Fox
"Treasure Hunt" (Back at the Barnyard) — Tom Sheppard; Nickelodeon

Comedy/variety – (including talk) series
The Colbert Report — Barry Julien, Dan Guterman, Eric Drysdale, Frank Lesser, Glenn Eichler, Jay Katsir, Max Werner, Meredith Scardino, Michael Brumm, Opus Moreschi, Peter Gwinn, Rich Dahm, Rob Dubbin, Scott Sherman, Stephen Colbert, Tom Purcell, Peter Grosz and Paul Dinello; Comedy Central
Penn & Teller: Bullshit! — Penn Jillette, Teller, Star Price, David Wechter, Michael Goudeau, Steve Melcher, Tom Kramer, Rich Nathanson; Showtime
Saturday Night Live — Head Writer: Seth Meyers; Writers: Doug Abeles, James Anderson, Alex Baze, Jillian Bell, Hannibal Buress, Jessica Conrad, James Downey, Steve Higgins, Colin Jost, Erik Kenward, Jessi Klein, Rob Klein, John Lutz, Seth Meyers, Lorne Michaels, John Mulaney, Christine Nangle, Michael Patrick O’Brien, Paula Pell, Ryan Perez, Simon Rich, Marika Sawyer, Akiva Schaffer, John Solomon, Emily Spivey, Kent Sublette, Jorma Taccone, Bryan Tucker; NBC
The Daily Show with Jon Stewart — Rory Albanese, Kevin Bleyer, Richard Blomquist, Steve Bodow, Tim Carvell, Wyatt Cenac, Hallie Haglund, JR Havlan, Elliott Kalan, Josh Lieb, Sam Means, Jo Miller, John Oliver, Daniel Radosh, Jason Ross, Jon Stewart; Comedy Central

Comedy/variety – music, awards, tributes – specials
National Memorial Day Concert 2010 — Joan Meyerson; PBS
The Simpsons 20th Anniversary Special – In 3-D! On Ice! — Jeremy Chilnick, Morgan Spurlock; Fox
Jimmy Kimmel Live: After the Academy Awards — Tony Barbieri, Jonathan Bines, Will Burke, Gary Greenberg, Sal Iacono, Jimmy Kimmel, Jonathan Kimmel, Jacob Lentz, Molly McNearney, Bryan Paulk, Rick Rosner; ABC

Daytime drama
As the World Turns — Susan Dansby, Lucky Gold, Janet Iacobuzio, Penelope Koechl, David Kreizman, Leah Laiman, David A. Levinson, Leslie Nipkow, Jean Passanante, Gordon Rayfield, David Smilow; CBS
General Hospital — Meg Bennett, Nathan Fissell, David Goldschmid, Robert Guza, Jr., Karen Harris, Elizabeth Korte, Mary Sue Price, David F. Ryan, Tracey Thomson, Michele Val Jean, Susan Wald; ABC
One Life to Live — Shelly Altman, Ron Carlivati, Anna Theresa Cascio, Aida Croal, Carolyn Culliton, Frederick Johnson, Elizabeth Page, Gordon Rayfield, Melissa Salmons, Katherine Schock, Scott Sickles, Courtney Simon, Chris VanEtten; ABC

Children's episodic & specials
"Happy Ha-Ha Holidays" (Imagination Movers) — Michael G. Stern, Randi Barnes, Rick Gitelson, Scott Gray; Disney Channel
"True Magic" (True Jackson, VP) — Andy Gordon; Nickelodeon

Children's script – long form or special
Avalon High — Teleplay by Julie Sherman Wolfe and Amy Talkington, Based on the novel by Meg Cabot; Disney Channel
The Boy Who Cried Werewolf — Art Brown, Douglas Sloan; Nickelodeon

Documentary – current events
"Flying Cheap" (Frontline) — Rick Young; PBS
"College, Inc." (Frontline) — Martin Smith, John Maggio; PBS
"The Card Game" (Frontline) — Lowell Bergman, Oriana Zill de Granados; PBS
"The Quake" (Frontline) — Martin Smith, Marcela Gaviria; PBS
"The Vaccine War" (Frontline) — Jon Palfreman; PBS
"The Warning" (Frontline) — Michael Kirk; PBS

Documentary – other than current events
"Wyatt Earp" (American Experience) — Rob Rapley; PBS
Baseball: The Tenth Inning, "Episode 1" — David McMahon, Lynn Novick, Ken Burns; PBS
"Dolley Madison" (American Experience) — Ronald H. Blumer; PBS
"Hubble’s Amazing Rescue" (Nova) — Rushmore DeNooyer; PBS
"LBJ’s Path to War" (Bill Moyers Journal) — Bill Moyers, Michael Winship; PBS
"Riddles of the Sphinx" (Nova) — Gary Glassman; PBS

News – regularly scheduled, bulletin or breaking report
"Sunday Morning Almanac" (CBS Sunday Morning) — Thomas A. Harris; CBS News
"The Flash Crash" (CBS News) — R. Polly Leider; CBS News

News – analysis, feature, or commentary
"Resurrecting Eden" (60 Minutes) — Jenny Dubin; CBS
"Democracy for Sale" (Bill Moyers Journal) — Bill Moyers, Michael Winship; PBS
"Making the Band, Making the Difference" (Good Morning America) — Mary Pflum; ABC News

Radio

Documentary
2009 Year in Review — Gail Lee; CBS Radio News

News – regularly scheduled or breaking report 
CBS World News Roundup — Paul Farry; CBS Radio News
Evening News Headlines 7/28/10 — Bill Spadaro; 1010 WINS Radio

News – analysis, feature, or commentary
"Passages" — Gail Lee; CBS Radio News
"Dishin Digital" — Robert Hawley; CBS Radio News

Promotional writing and graphic animation

On-air promotion (radio or television)
CSI Promos — Anne de Vega; CBS
NBC News Promos — Jennifer Kaas; NBC News

Television graphic animation
"Sunday Morning, By Design" (CBS Sunday Morning) — Graphic Designer: Bob Pook, Graphic Artist: Diane Robinson; CBS News

Video game writing
Assassin's Creed: Brotherhood — Story by Patrice Desilets, Jeffrey Yohalem, Corey May; Lead Script Writer: Jeffrey Yohalem; Script Writers: Ethan Petty, Nicholas Grimwood, Matt Turner; Ubisoft
Fallout: New Vegas — Creative Design Lead/Lead Writer: John Gonzalez; Writers: Chris Avellone, Eric Fenstermaker, Travis Stout; Additional Writing: Tess Treadwell, George Ziets, Jason Bergman, Nick Breckon, Matt Grandstaff, Will Noble, Andrew Scharf; Bethesda Softworks
God of War III — Marianne Krawczyk; Additional Writing by Stig Asmussen, Ariel Lawrence, William Weissbaum; Sony Computer Entertainment
Prince of Persia: The Forgotten Sands (Wii) — Writer: Benjamin McCaw; Story Dialogue Editor: Marianne Krawczyk; Ubisoft
Singularity — Marc Guggenheim, Lindsey Allen, Emily Silver; Additional Story and Writing: Jason Henderson, Adam Foshko, Michael Cassutt; Story and Script Consultant: Adam Foshko; Activision
Star Wars: The Force Unleashed II — Executive Producer-Writer: Haden Blackman; In-Game Script: David Collins, John Stafford, Cameron Suey; Additional Writing: Tid Cooney, Ian Dominguez, Tony Rowe; LucasArts

New media writing

Outstanding achievement in writing original new media
"The Real Thing", "Identity Crisis", "Girl Talk", "Naming Things", "Curtain Up" (Anyone But Me) — Susan Miller, Tina Cesa Ward; www.AnyoneButMeSeries.com
"Episode 1", "Episode 4", "Episode 5", "Episode 6", "Episode 7" (All’s Faire) — Thom Woodley & Bob McClure & Matt Yeager; www.Allsfaire.tv
"Episode 1: We’ve Got Flash", "Episode 2: Complimentary Sandwiches", "Episode 3: Perfect Resume Builder" (Concierge: The Series), Written by Timothy Cooper, www.ConciergeTheSeries.com
"Zac" (Madison Avery) — Gregory Storm; www.stormfactory.com

Outstanding achievement in writing derivative new media
"Strip Pong", "Tear Jerks", "Brainstorm" (Frank vs. Lutz) — Jon Haller; 30 Rock New Media, www.nbc.com
"Webisode One: Moving On", "Webisode Two: Lights, Camera, Action!", "Webisode Three: The Final Product" (The 3rd Floor, The Office Webisodes) — Kelly Hannon, Jonathan Hughes, Mary Wall; www.nbc.com

References

2010
W
Writers Guild of America
W
Writers Guild of America Awards
2010 in American cinema
2010 in American television
Writers Guild of America Awards